Neemat Georges Frem (Arabic: نعمة ج. افرام‎‎‎; born 10 September 1967) is a Lebanese politician, businessman and an incumbent Member of the Lebanese Parliament from Keserwan and Byblos constituency serving from May 2022. He previously held the position under same constituency since 2018 but resigned shortly after the Beirut explosion, on 9 August 2020, as a protest against the corruption and the failure of the Lebanese political system that led to the financial collapse and the destruction of Beirut. He also served as the Chair of the National Economy, Trade, Industry & Planning Parliamentary Commission and as an active member in the Immigrants and Foreign Affairs Parliamentary Commission at the time.

He is currently the president of the executive board of “Project Watan”, a national political movement that according to the group "aims to ensure the happiness and dignity of the Lebanese people and build a state of freedom, prosperity and sovereignty".

Neemat Frem is also the chief executive of the multinational company INDEVCO Group, employing over 10,000 people worldwide. He is the founder and president of Phoenix Machinery and president of Phoenix Group. Frem is also former president of the Association of Lebanese Industrialists. He presided the Maronite Foundation in the World from 2016 to 2018.

Neemat Frem is the founder and Board Member of several associations promoting inter-religious (Christian-Islamic) dialogue. In 2013, he launched “Better Lebanon" initiative, a national, holistic, and visionary approach to propelling Lebanon’s economic, social and governance reforms. In 2019, the initiative was institutionalized as an NGO, which coordinates with other organizations and the Diaspora to provide sustainable development, humanitarian aid and social support.

Early life and education
Neemat Frem was born on 10 September 1967 in Jounieh, Keserwan of Lebanon. He is the son of INDEVCO Group founder Georges Frem, a Lebanese politician who served as a minister in various cabinets over three periods, between 1982 and 2003.

He completed school at Collège Saint Joseph – Antoura, and graduated from the American University of Beirut with a bachelor's degree in Electrical Engineering in 1991. He then completed a postgraduate diploma on leadership and business from Harvard University Business School, Georgetown University Business School and Stanford University Business School.

In July 2018, Frem received a Doctorate Honoris Causa from the Holy Spirit University of Kaslik. He holds two US patents. His first patent, registered in 2007, is an automated sandwich-making dispenser. His second patent, registered in 2017, is a Solar Mill Fluid Expansion Engine.

Career

Business career 
After graduating from the American University of Beirut (AUB) in 1991, Frem became Design and Project coordinator at INDEVCO Group, an international group of companies manufacturing corrugated, plastic and paper packaging, tissue, as well as household, institutional, and personal care disposables.

In 1994, he was appointed the General Manager of Unipak Tissue Mill – the first paper mill in the Middle East to achieve certification by Lloyd’s Register Quality Assurance and rapidly became a leading supplier of soft tissue paper in the Mediterranean basin.

In 1998, he founded and managed Phoenix Machinery, with a view to bridging the distance between the traditional activities of INDEVCO and the technology industry. Currently, the company is a provider of renewable energy and waste management services, as well as engineering products to the Middle East and North Africa. In response to the increasing demand during COVID-19 pandemic in Lebanon in 2020, the company started manufacturing state-of-the-art ICU ventilators conforming to ISO 9001:2015, ISO 13485:2016, CE certificate: medical devices directive 93/42/EEC (21449), LIBNOR, FDA certificate in collaboration with AUH.

During the economic crisis in Lebanon, intensified by the fuel shortage, Phoenix EV also provided the Lebanese with a fleet of electric cars to face the unprecedented times, economize and contribute to a cleaner environment.

In 2000, Frem was appointed Managing Director for all INDEVCO Lebanon Operations until 2005 where he then became the Chairman and chief executive officer (CEO) of INDEVCO Group.

Neemat Frem also served as the CEO of Interstate Resources, Inc. (IRI) in the US. IRI was the big industrial success of INDEVCO group in North America and is today part of DS Smith.

In 2017, he financed the launch of the Olive Grove, a new cluster of tech startups in Hamra, Beirut.

Political career 
In 2018, Frem announced his candidacy for the 2018 Lebanese General Election, running for the Maronite seat in the Keserwan and Byblos constituency. His campaign driver was “People First”. Following the general election held on 6 May 2018, he was officially announced as a winning candidate with the highest number of votes.

Frem served as the Chair of the Commission of the National Economy, Trade, Industry and Planning. He called for the restructuring of the Lebanese public administration in order to boost national productivity. He was the first deputy to inquire about the Lebanese administration’s recruitments figures.  

Frem presented a bill to the parliament to cancel old municipal payables under Sukleen and help face one of the biggest forms of endemic corruption in the country.

In late February 2020, Better Lebanon founded by Frem, prepared a master-plan to help equip Lebanon to respond to COVID-19 pandemic. They partnered with INDEVCO and Phoenix Machinery to manufacture state of-the-art ventilators and cost-efficient personal protective equipment meeting international standards.

In October 2020, as the Chair of the Commission of the National Economy, Trade, Industry and Planning Frem elaborated a 5-year plan to achieve a zero budget deficit to rescue Lebanon from the economic crisis and presented it to all concerned officials as a proposed framework for future government budgets and a major guideline for ministries, public institutions and administrations. Despite all the warnings of the commission, the public administration ignored all the corrective actions presented in this plan. Shortly after the Beirut explosion, on 9 August 2020, he announced his resignation from the parliament in protest against the corruption and the unproductivity of the Lebanese political system that led to the financial collapse and the destruction of Beirut.  

In July 2021, determined to face the total collapse of the Lebanese State and alleviate the dire economic situation wrecking the Lebanese’s daily lives, Frem – together with a group of concerned figures refusing the current situation with a fearless determination for change – launched “Project Watan”, a national political movement. According to the founders, “Project Watan” strives to shape a new creative identity for Lebanon through large-scale reforms and serious plans for political, social, cultural and economic development.

In 2022, Frem announced his candidacy for the 2022 Lebanese General Election, running for the Maronite seat in the Keserwan and Byblos constituency. His campaign driver was “Vote for Happiness”. Following the general election held on 15 May 2022, he was officially announced as a winning candidate.

Other mandates 
 Member of Immigrants and Foreign Affairs Committee.
 Founder and Board Member of a number of associations promoting inter-religious (Christian – Islamic) dialogue and civic society.
 Founder and president of Phellipolis, the association that organizes the Jounieh International Festival

References

External Links
 
 Project Watan

Lebanese businesspeople
Living people
1967 births
Lebanese Maronites
Members of the Parliament of Lebanon
People from Jounieh